The 2013–14 Arkansas Razorbacks men's basketball team represented the University of Arkansas in the 2013–14 college basketball season. The team's head coach is Mike Anderson. The team played their home games at Bud Walton Arena in Fayetteville, Arkansas, as a member of the SEC.

Preseason
Coach Mike Anderson completed his second season by posting a 19–13 record during the 2012–2013 season, where the Razorbacks finished seventh in the SEC. The Razorbacks did not participate in any postseason play.

Departures

Incoming class

Postseason
For the first time since the 2007–08 season, the Razorbacks were invited to a postseason tournament, earning a spot in the NIT after winning 21 games in the regular season. Arkansas drew Indiana State as its first round opponent, the first meeting between the two programs since the 1979 Midwest regional final, and defeated the Sycamores 91-71 at home. Arkansas fell to California on the road in the second round, 75-64.

Roster

Schedule and results

|-
!colspan=12 style="background:#C41E3A; color:#FFFFFF;"| Exhibition

|-
!colspan=12 style="background:#C41E3A; color:#FFFFFF;"| Non-conference regular season

|-
!colspan=12 style="background:#C41E3A; color:#FFFFFF;"| SEC regular season

|-
!colspan=12 style="background:#C41E3A;"| SEC Tournament

|-
!colspan=12 style="background:#C41E3A;"| NIT

Source: 2013–14 Schedule

References

Arkansas
Arkansas Razorbacks men's basketball seasons
Arkansas
Razor
Razor